Frontera is a city and the municipal seat of Centla Municipality, Tabasco in Mexico.

References

Populated places in Tabasco